The 34th News & Documentary Emmy Awards were held on October 1, 2013, at Rose Hall, Home of Jazz at Lincoln Center, located in the Time Warner Center in New York City. Awards were presented in 42 categories, including Breaking News, Investigative Reporting, Outstanding Interview, and Best Documentary. In attendance were over 900 television and news media industry executives, news and documentary producers and journalists.

Notable awards included the Lifetime Achievement Award given to David Fanning, founder and executive producer of Frontline.

Winners

Network breakdown
The following chart is a breakdown of number of awards won this awards season per station.

Breakdown by program

Awards

Presenters
 Ted Koppel, Special Correspondent NBC News, News Analyst NPR, and Contribution Columnist to The New York Times, The Washington Post and The Wall Street Journal
 Sharyl Attkisson, Investigative Correspondent CBS News
 Candy Crowley, Chief Political Correspondent CNN, host of State of the Union
 David Muir, Correspondent ABC News, Weekend Anchor of ABC World News, co-Anchor of 20/20
 Katty Kay, Anchor of the BBC World News America
 Alex Wagner, Host of MSNBC's Now with Alex Wagner
 Marvin Scott, Senior Correspondent WPIX-TV, anchor/host of PIX News Close Up
 N.J. Burkett, award-winning correspondent WABC-TV, President of the National Academy of Television Arts and Sciences
 Bruce Paisner, President & CEO, The International Academy of Television Arts & Sciences

References

External links
 Official Site
 List of Nominees 

34
2013 television awards
2013 in New York City
October 2013 events in the United States